Motka station is a railway station in Chunghŭng-rodongjagu, Samjiyon City, Ryanggang province, North Korea, on the Samjiyŏn Line of the Korean State Railway.

History
The station, along with the rest of the Samjiyŏn Line, was opened by the Korean State Railway in 1948. Extensive flooding in 1994 led to the closure of the line, and the station has since been out of use. It is to be the terminus of the standard gauge replacement for the closed narrow gauge line.

References

Railway stations in North Korea